Tavita Asotui Peter Eli (born January 31, 1996) is a professional Canadian football offensive lineman for the Winnipeg Blue Bombers of the Canadian Football League. Eli is a Canadian born in Richmond, British Columbia but he is of Samoan heritage. He played college football for the Hawaii Rainbow Warriors, an injury in 2018 cost him the entire season and Eli walked away from football. Prior to the 2019 CFL Draft, Eli was contacted by the Bombers to see if he was interested in playing football again, to which he responded yes. Ultimately, he was drafted in the fourth round, 34th overall by the Bombers. Eli helped anchor the Bombers' offensive line during their 2019 season which saw Andrew Harris win the rushing title. In that same season, he also played in the 107th Grey Cup where the Blue Bombers won over the Hamilton Tiger-Cats 33-12, which was the team's first Grey Cup in 28 years.

References

External links
Winnipeg Blue Bombers bio

1996 births
Living people
Canadian football offensive linemen
Players of Canadian football from British Columbia
People from Richmond, British Columbia
Winnipeg Blue Bombers players
Hawaii Rainbow Warriors football players
Canadian people of Samoan descent